Still Life with Ham is a mid-19th century still life painting by French artist Philippe Rousseau. Done in oil on canvas, the painting depicts a number of items set on a table. The work is currently in the collection of the Metropolitan Museum of Art.

Description 
The painting is intricately and intimately detailed; not only did Rousseau render a ham (described as "succulent" by one source) and a fully set table, he also included an issue of Le Figaro (a prominent French newspaper) addressed to his home. The work is highly contemporaneous to the early 1870s.

References 

1870 paintings
Paintings in the collection of the Metropolitan Museum of Art
Still life paintings
Food and drink paintings